The 2011 All-Australian team represents the best performed Australian Football League (AFL) players during the 2011 season. The team was announced on 19 September as a complete Australian rules football team of 22 players. The team is honorary and does not play any games.

Selection panel
The selection panel for the 2011 All-Australian team consisted of chairman Andrew Demetriou, Adrian Anderson, Kevin Bartlett, Luke Darcy, Danny Frawley, Glen Jakovich, Leigh Matthews and Mark Ricciuto.

Team

Initial squad
An initial squad of 40 players was previously announced on 6 September.

Final team

Note: the position of coach in the All-Australian team is traditionally awarded to the coach of the premiership team.

References

All-Australian team
All-Australian Team